The 1974 Prize of Moscow News was the ninth edition of an international figure skating competition organized in Moscow, Soviet Union. It was held December 7–11, 1974. Medals were awarded in the disciplines of men's singles, ladies' singles, pair skating and ice dancing.

Men

Ladies

Pairs

Ice dancing

References

Prize of Moscow News
1974 in figure skating